The following is a list of international prime ministerial trips made by prime ministers of the United Kingdom in reverse chronological order.

Rishi Sunak (2022–present)

Liz Truss (2022)

Boris Johnson (2019–2022)

Theresa May (2016–2019)

David Cameron (2010–2016)

Gordon Brown (2007–2010)

Tony Blair (1997–2007) 

 2006 Group of Eight summit in Saint Petersburg.

John Major (1990–1997)

Margaret Thatcher (1979–1990)

References

See also 
 List of international trips made by prime ministers of India
List of international trips made by presidents of the United States

Foreign relations of the United Kingdom

State visits by British leaders
United Kingdom diplomacy-related lists
United Kingdom
United Kingdom